The Pikes Peak Writers Conference started in 1993 and during each April, brings the New York publishing industry to Colorado Springs, Colorado for a weekend packed with workshops, pitch meetings, read & critique sessions and much more. Writer's Digest Magazine voted Pikes Peak Writers Conference one of the top ten writing conferences in the United States.  Guest speakers have included Nora Roberts, Stephen Coonts, Diane Mott Davidson, Robert Crais, Jennifer Crusie, Rupert Holmes, David Morrell, Susan Elizabeth Phillips, Jim Butcher, and many more authors and publishing professionals.

Upcoming 2015 Conference

Mark your calendars! Pikes Peak Writers is busy planning a dynamite conference for April 23-26, 2015.  Our theme is Choose Your Writing Adventure. We are excited to announce our confirmed keynotes: Mary Kay Andrews, Andrew Gross, Seanan McGuire, and R. L. Stine
Check out the website at www.pikespeakwriters.com

PPWC History

2014
Pikes Peak Writers held a dynamite conference from April 24-27, 2014. The theme was Write Here, Write Now! Make it Happen! Faculty members included: Agatha, Anthony, Macavity and Emmy winning author Hank Phillippi Ryan, New York Times Bestselling Author Gail Carriger, Campbell Award Nominee & Emmy Award Writer Chuck Wendig and Hugo Award Winning Fantasy Writer Jim C. Hines.

2013
The 2013 Conference will take place April 19-21, 2013 and this year's theme is "Writing from the Ashes: Never Lose Sight of Your Dreams." Featured speakers include Libba Bray, Barry Eisler, Amber Benson, and David Liss. In addition, PPWC will have ten editors and agents including Michael Braff (Del Rey Books), Melissa Miller (Katherine Tegen Books/HarperCollins), Pat VanWie (Bell Bridge Books), Deb Werksman (Sourcebooks), Hannah Bowman (Liza Dawson Associates), Sorche Fairbank (Fairbank Literary Representation), Barry Goldblatt (Barry Goldblatt Literary), Nicole Resciniti (The Seymour Agency), Kate Testerman (kt literary), and Pam van Hylckama Vlieg (Larsen Pomada Literary Agents).

2012
The 2012 Pikes Peak Writers Conference "Celebrating 20 years of Success" occurred on April 19-22, 2012  at the Marriott Colorado Springs. Featured speakers included Robert Crais, Donald Maass, Jeffery Deaver, and Susan Wiggs. Eleven agents and editors took appointments and gave critiques. Celebratory events included a special booksigning, an awards gala banquet and special gifts for  attendees.

2011   
The 2011 Pikes Peak Writers Conference took place on April 29-May 1, 2011 at the Marriott Colorado Springs. The theme was "Blaze the Write Trail" with featured speakers John Hart, Linda Lael Miller, and Beth Kendrick. Ten agents and editors attended.

2010   
The 2010 Pikes Peak Writers Conference took place on April 22-25, 2010 at the Marriott Colorado Springs. The keynote speakers included Donald Maass, Kelley Armstrong, Jodi Thomas and Tim Dorsey.  Eleven agents and editors attended.

2009
The 2009 Pikes Peak Writers Conference took place on April 23-26, 2009 at the Marriott Colorado Springs. The keynote speakers included Jeffery Deaver, James N. Frey, Laura Resnick and Barbara Samuel. Eleven agents and editors attended.

2008
The 2008 Pikes Peak Writers Conference was held April 25–27 2008 at the Marriott Colorado Springs. Featured speakers included Geffen Award winner Carol Berg, NYT Best Selling author Vicki Lewis Thompson, Edgar Award winner David Liss, and Comic writers/artists Walter Simonson and Louise Simonson.

2007
The 2007 Pikes Peak Writers Conference was held April 20–22, 2007 at the Marriott Colorado Springs on Tech Center Drive. (Formerly known as the Wyndham Hotel.) Featured speakers included Jim Butcher, author of the Dresden Files series, Robert Crais, author of the Elvis Cole books, Mary Jo Putney, USAToday bestselling author of romance and fantasy and Dr. Eric Maisel, renown creativity coach. The conference celebrated its 15th year with several special events including a Thursday night booksigning, an additional track of workshops on Friday, a Saturday night Awards Banquet and 15th Anniversary Celebration and a never-before Sunday-only option for readers and fans of Robert Crais. 

Conferences were also held from 1993 to 2006.

External links 
 Pikes Peak Writers Website
 Pikes Peak Writers Conference Website

Writers' conferences
Colorado culture